Du Boulay is a surname, and may refer to:

 Arthur du Boulay (1880–1918), British military officer
 César-Egasse du Boulay (died 1678), French historian
 Clair du Boulay, British expert in pathology and medical education
 F. R. H. Du Boulay (1920–2008), British medieval historian
 François Jacques Houssemayne Du Boulay (1759–1828), British financier
 Henry Du Boulay (1840–1925), Archdeacon of Bodmin, Cornwall
 James Houssemayne Du Boulay (1868–1943), British civil servant in India
 Sir Roger Du Boulay (1922–2020), British diplomat
 Shirley du Boulay (born 1933), British author and biographer

See also
 Boulay